Geoff or Jeff Barnett may refer to:

Geoff Barnett (footballer) (1946–2021), English football player
Geoff Barnett (cricketer) (born 1984), Canadian cricketer
Jeff Barnett (politician), American politician, colonel and author